Vitta clenchi is a species of sea snail, a marine gastropod mollusk in the family Neritidae.

Distribution
The snail is found in the West Indies and Gulf of Mexico.

Description
The shells are smooth and neritiform with a dark base, heavily speckled with a lighter color. They live in brackish or fresh water, primarily being found in the estuaries of its region. The species is gonochoric and are broadcast spawners.

References

 Russell H. D. 1940. Some new Neritidae from the West Indies. Memorias de la Sociedad Cubana de Historia Natural “Felipe Poey”, 14(4): 257-262, pl. 46.
 Eichhorst T.E. (2016). Neritidae of the world. Volume 2. Harxheim: Conchbooks. Pp. 696-1366.

External links
 Czaja, A.; Meza-Sánchez, I. G.; Estrada-Rodríguez, J. L.; Romero-Méndez, U.; Sáenz-Mata, J.; Ávila-Rodríguez, V.; Becerra-López, J. L.; Estrada-Arellano, J. R.; Cardoza-Martínez, G. F.; Aguillón-Gutiérrez, D. R.; Cordero-Torres, D. G.; Covich, A. P. (2020). The freshwater snails (Mollusca: Gastropoda) of Mexico: updated checklist, endemicity hotspots, threats and conservation status. Revista Mexicana de Biodiversidad. 91: e912909.

Neritidae
Gastropods described in 1940